Chief Sekhonyana Nehemia Maseribane (4 May 1918 – 3 November 1986) served as the first prime minister of Basutoland (now Lesotho) from 6 May 1965 to 7 July 1965.

References

External links

1918 births
1986 deaths
Prime Ministers of Lesotho